Baraboo High School is a high school in Baraboo, Wisconsin, and is a part of the Baraboo School District. It serves more than 900 students in grades 9–12 from Baraboo, West Baraboo, North Freedom, and a portion of Lake Delton. The school's colors are blue and gold.

History

Early history 
When the school district was first established, the district was solely within the City of Baraboo; the district charged tuition for students living in West Baraboo and in other surrounding areas.

In 1869 Baraboo's first school facility made of brick, a French Second Empire-style building with a cost of about $33,000, including the furniture, opened on Second Street, with Ash and Oak on each side; this became Baraboo High School. Baraboo at the time had no railroad service, so the bricks used to build the school were made in Baraboo. Fire escapes were installed shortly after the school was built. The Sauk County Historical Society stated that by 1906 the school facility was "overcrowded". There was criticism in the community over the perceived lack of safety and overcrowding.

1900s 
The building was destroyed by a February 9, 1906 fire; no deaths occurred. The fire did not spread to other structures since the school was made of brick. Students and staff had salvaged supplies from the first floor, while much of the content on the upper floors was destroyed. Several days after the fire, the building collapsed, and it was later demolished. Various facilities served as temporary classrooms as a new building was constructed. In a fifteen-month period the Baraboo High fire was the third major fire.

In September 1907 a new three story,  by  red brick building opened. The new building had electronic bells, clocks, fire alarms, and lighting, as well as a connection from the school administration to public safety services. Construction occurred for about a year prior to the opening. Shortly after the opening some of the plaster ceilings collapsed, so the school was temporarily closed as the ceilings were replaced. By the period prior to 1928 Baraboo High occupied one of two buildings on the block of 311 Ash Street, with both sharing a heating system, and the other being Baraboo's junior high school.

In 1928 a new high school campus at 124 Second Street was under construction, designed by Claude and Starck of Madison, Wisconsin and funded by $225,000, and it opened in 1929. The previous junior high building of 311 Ash Street was demolished while the former senior high school building at that address became the junior high building; it was later demolished circa 1960. In 1938 an underground passage was built between 124 2nd and 311 Ash.

The Sauk County Historical Society stated "By the late 1950s, it was again apparent that the Baraboo High School building was not big enough for the growing number of students." There were two attempts in the 1950s by the district to raise money to have a new Baraboo High built, but voters rejected both proposals. In 1961 a new building, in the periphery of Baraboo, was built for $1,719,278. This occurred after the city council decided, in September 1960, to have an advisory referendum held on November 8, 1960 on where the school should be located. The board members ultimately chose a site on Draper Street, on land donated by the Draper family, even though the largest number of voters had selected the Broadway site. The district boundaries expanded in 1961–1962, so areas previously paying tuition no longer had to.

The 124 Second Street building initially became the new junior high school. 124 Second Street became the Baraboo Civic Center in 1979, after a new junior high building opened that year. The Civic Center building is a part of the Downtown Baraboo Historic District, listed on the National Register of Historic Places on June 8, 2015.

2000s 
Around 2015 a parking lot and roof were being renovated, while an office was demolished by June of that year. As of 2018, a renovation program was underway; it was funded by a bond approved by 58% of the voters on November 8, 2016. Groundbreaking occurred on June 7, 2017. Eppstein Uhen Architects is responsible for the renovations. The renovations included a new fitness facility, fire sprinkler systems, temperature control infrastructure, and the following expanded facilities: art facilities, cafeteria, and a commons, a family and consumer education area, a physical education areas, and a technical education area. In addition the library and student services area were to be renovated. The renovations are to start in the west side of the school, and then go to other portions when that area was complete; that way classes could be held around the renovation schedule. The renovations had a total cost of $22 million. The expected completion date of the west side was spring 2018, and the overall scheduled completion date was August 2018; a ribbon-cutting ceremony for the newly-renovated school was scheduled for August 29, 2018.

In November 2018, a photograph of students raising their hands in what looks like a Sieg Heil Nazi salute was shared on social media.  The photographer who took the picture claimed that his instruction to the students was, "OK boys, you're going to say goodbye to your parents. So wave." One of the students photographed, who did not raise his hand, stated, "He did not say raise your hand in a Nazi symbol way. And I'm pretty sure my classmates just interpreted as raise your hand, let's do this as a joke." When asked if he knew what that gesture meant, another student present at the time stated, "No. Nobody knew what it was." An unnamed former Baraboo High student quoted in an article published in The Independent claimed that individuals pictured in the photograph openly used racial epithets in school, and upon reporting this behavior, the school administration failed to take action against them. The photo was condemned by the Auschwitz Memorial, State Senator Jon Erpenbach, and Wisconsin Governor-elect Tony Evers. School District Administrator Lori M. Mueller issued a statement that "the photo of students posted to #BarabooProud is not reflective of the educational values and beliefs of the School District of Baraboo. The District will pursue any and all available and appropriate actions, including legal, to address." On November 21, in a letter to parents, Mueller said the involved students are protected by the First Amendment from punishment by the district.

Extracurricular activities 
Athletics include:
 Boys and Girls basketball
 Boys and Girls soccer
 Baseball
 Football
 Boys and Girls hockey
 Boys and Girls cross country
 Girls volleyball
 Wrestling
 Softball
 Boys and Girls swimming
 Gymnastics
 Boys and Girls track and field
 Boys and Girls tennis

In 2017 the six tennis courts at the high school were falling into poor repair due to soil conditions, with two of the courts severely damaged. At that time the district was discussing with University of Wisconsin–Baraboo/Sauk County (UW-Baraboo) the possibility of having new tennis courts built on the college property with the district sharing the courts.

The Baraboo High marching band has participated in the Great Circus Parade, typically wearing clown outfits.  the marching band had been there every year it was held.

See also
 List of high schools in Wisconsin

References

External links
 Baraboo High School
 

Public high schools in Wisconsin
Education in Sauk County, Wisconsin
Baraboo, Wisconsin